Shaikpet Sarai is a sarai (resthouse) in Hyderabad, India.

History 
It was built by Abdullah Qutb Shah in the 17th century. It is a heritage structure and in need of restoration.

Architecture 
The sarai had 30 rooms, stables for horses and camels, a mosque and a tomb of an unknown Sufi saint. It could accommodate 500 people.

Inscriptions 
Six panels of inscriptions adorn the Qibla wall in the mosque.

See also 

 Nampally Sarai

References 

Buildings and structures in Hyderabad, India
Caravanserais in India